The South African Railways Class 1A  of 1910 was a steam locomotive from the pre-Union era in the Colony of Natal.

In 1910, the Natal Government Railways placed 21 improved Class B  Mastodon type tender locomotives in service. In 1912, when these locomotives were assimilated into the South African Railways, they were renumbered and designated Class 1A.

Manufacturer

By 1909, more locomotives were required for goods operation on the lower sections of the Natal mainline and a further 21 locomotives of the   Mastodon design were ordered by the Natal Government Railways (NGR). They were delivered and placed in service in 1910, built by the North British Locomotive Company with Type TJ tenders and numbered in the range from 13 to 33. These locomotives were also officially designated Class B and, since they incorporated various improvements on the locomotives of 1904, they became commonly known as the Class Improved Hendrie B.

Characteristics
Like their predecessors, they had Belpaire fireboxes with combustion chambers and Walschaerts valve gear.

With one exception, they used Murdoch's D slide valves like the 1904 locomotives. The last locomotive, no. 33, was an experimental locomotive equipped with piston valves.

Hendrie's steam reverser

They were built with Hendrie’s steam reversers. The Hendrie steam reversing gear consisted of a  diameter steam cylinder and a  diameter oil cylinder, arranged in line on a bracket which was fixed to the main engine frame on the driver's side. The cylinders had a common piston rod which had a slot in the centre, between the cylinders. This slot accommodated a sliding crosshead which engaged with an arm fixed to the reversing shaft.

By means of a small lever, the driver could admit steam to either end of the steam cylinder, which would open a cataract valve arranged on top of the oil cylinder to allow oil to flow from either end of the oil cylinder to the other. A pointer in the cab would indicate the exact position of the reversing gear and, when the desired position was reached, bringing the hand lever to the central position would close the cataract valve and fix the gear in the forward or reverse position.

South African Railways

When the Union of South Africa was established on 31 May 1910, the three Colonial government railways (Cape Government Railways, NGR and Central South African Railways) were united under a single administration to control and administer the railways, ports and harbours of the Union. Although the South African Railways and Harbours came into existence in 1910, the actual classification and renumbering of all the rolling stock of the three constituent railways were only implemented with effect from 1 January 1912.

In 1912, these locomotives were renumbered in the range from 1289 to 1309 and designated Class 1A on the South African Railways (SAR).

Service
When new, they were used to haul fast passenger and goods trains between Durban and Pietermaritzburg. In SAR service, they were also used on mainline workings out of Port Elizabeth. In later years they were relegated to shunting, particularly working in Natal but also in Cape Town, Port Elizabeth, East London and in Transvaal. None of them was reboilered with a Watson Standard boiler with a round-topped firebox.

In their last years, few Class 1 and Class 1A locomotives were still at work. As at April 1973, for example, there were still three working at Mason’s Mill in Pietermaritzburg and one in the Eastern Transvaal, two of them Class 1A. The last Class 1A locomotive was retired by the SAR in November 1974.

In industrial service, no. 1301 survived longer and was still in service as Apex Mines no. 3 at Greenside in 1984. In 2019, 1301 was donated by Apex Mines to UK based North British Locomotive Preservation Group. It is planned to restore the locomotive at the Wonderboom Transport Museum, Pretoria before repatriating it to the UK.

Works numbers and renumbering
Their works numbers, numbering and SAR renumbering are listed in the table.

Preservation
One example has survived into preservation.

Illustration
The main picture shows a Class 1A locomotive with a modified Type TJ tender, while the following picture shows one with a Type TL tender which was rebuilt from a Type TJ tender c. 1930.

References

External links

1190
1190
4-8-0 locomotives
2D locomotives
NBL locomotives
Cape gauge railway locomotives
Railway locomotives introduced in 1910
1910 in South Africa
Scrapped locomotives